Alexy Semenovich Kozlov (sometimes given as Aleksey Kozlov or, in his own transliteration, as Alexey Kozlov, ; born 13 October 1935 in Moscow) is a Russian saxophonist. He was part of the first group of prominent Soviet-era Russian jazz musicians which emerged during the 1960s. He founded the band , which is considered the preeminent Jazz-rock fusion ensemble in Russia.

He is a People's Artist of Russia.

References

Jazz saxophonists
Russian jazz musicians
People's Artists of Russia
1935 births
Musicians from Moscow
Living people
Russian jazz composers
21st-century saxophonists